K. Jamuna Rani (born 17 May 1938 in Andhra Pradesh, India) is an Indian playback singer who has sung over 6,000 songs in Sinhalese, Tamil, Telugu, Kannada and Malayalam lnguages.

Life and career
Rani was born to K. Varadarajulu and violinist K. Droupathy.

She first contributed her voice to film at the age of seven for the Telugu movie Tyagayya (1946). By thirteen, Rani was vocalising for lead characters in films like Valayapathi and Kalyani. She had a hit score with Aasaiyum En Nesamum from the Tamil film Gulebakavali in 1955.

Jamuna Rani first sang in Sri Lankan cinema for Sujatha in 1953 under the direction of composer Ananda Samarakoon. She subsequently contributed to Warada Kageda (1954), Seda Sulang (1955), Mathalan (1955), Suraya (1957) and Vana Mohini (1958). 'Jeevana Mea Gamana Sansare' which she sang with A. M. Rajah for the movie 'Seda Sulang' is one of the all-time favourite Sinhala cinema songs in Sri Lanka.

She had few songs in the early 1970s. After a hiatus, she came back to Tamil songs in Nayakan (1987) and Annan Ennada Thambi Ennada (1992).
In 50s and 60s she sang for many films likePasamalar, Tamil and Mooga manusulu Telugu etc

Music composers she sang for 
She worked under G. Ramanathan, K. V. Mahadevan, S. Dakshinamurthi, A. M. Rajah, Vedha, V. Nagayya, J. A. Rehman, Pendyala Nageshwara Rao, T. Chalapathi Rao, Ananda Samarakoon, T. G. Lingappa, Viswanathan–Ramamoorthy, T. A. Kalyanam, M. S. Gnanamani, S. Rajeswara Rao, S. Hanumantha Rao, Master Venu, R. Sudarsanam, G. K. Venkatesh, V. T. Rajagopalan, V. Kumar, T. R. Pappa, S. V. Venkatraman, Vijaya Bhaskar, Ghantasala, Kunnakkudi Vaidyanathan, S. M. Subbaiah Naidu, S. P. Kodandapani, V. Kumar, Brother Lakshmanan, M. B. Sreenivasan, G. Devarajan, M. S. Baburaj, Ilaiyaraaja and Chandrabose.

Playback singers she sang with
She sang immemorable duets mostly with T. M. Soundararajan, A. M. Rajah, Seerkazhi Govindarajan, A. L. Raghavan, P. B. Sreenivas, and Mohideen Baig. Others are Ghantasala, Thiruchi Loganathan, J. P. Chandrababu, S. C. Krishnan, Dharapuram Sundararajan, V. T. Rajagopalan, H. R. Jothipala, Kamukara Purushothaman, P. Kalinga Rao and Pithapuram Nageswara Rao.

She also sang duets with female singers with most notably with P. Suseela, P. Leela, L. R. Easwari and Jikki. Others are A. P. Komala, A. G. Rathnamala, S. Janaki, M. L. Vasanthakumari, T. V. Rathnam, K. Rani, Swarnalatha, M. S. Rajeswari, Soolamangalam Rajalakshmi, L. R. Anjali, Swarna and Renuka.

Discography

Awards
 Kalaimamani award from the State Government of Tamil Nadu in 1998.
 Tamil Nadu State Film Honorary Award - Arignar Annadurai award in 2002.
 Puratchi Thalaivi Dr. J. Jayalalithaa Special Kalaimamani Award by the Government of Tamil Nadu in 2020.

References

External links
 
 The Titillating Voices of Two Tamil Playback Singers in Movie minutes
 Listen to some popular songs of Jamuna Rani at Raaga.com
  Jamuna Rani's Sinhalese on Line Songs – Listen to them at Siyapath Arana.com

1938 births
Living people
Indian women playback singers
Telugu playback singers
Kannada playback singers
Film musicians from Andhra Pradesh
Tamil playback singers
20th-century Indian singers
Malayalam playback singers
Singers from Andhra Pradesh
Women musicians from Andhra Pradesh
20th-century Indian women singers